Sir Jean-Georges Garneau (19 November 1864 – 5 February 1944) was a Canadian politician, the mayor of Quebec City from 1906 to 1910.

Sir Georges Garneau was a railroad engineer involved in the construction of track between Lac Saint-Jean and Quebec City. In 1904, he became an analytical chemistry professor at Université Laval, before becoming Quebec City's mayor in 1906. From 1908 to 1939, he served as the first president of the National Battlefields Commission, which manages the Plains of Abraham site in Quebec City.

References

External links
  University of Sherbrooke, Bilan du Siècle: Jean-Georges Garneau (1864-1944) Homme politique, homme d'affaires
  Ville de Québec toponymie (Quebec City toponymy): Garneau avenue

1864 births
1944 deaths
Canadian Knights Bachelor
Mayors of Quebec City
Academic staff of Université Laval